Kasabian is an English alternative rock band formed in 1997 by Sergio Pizzorno (guitar), Tom Meighan (lead vocals), Chris Edwards (bass guitar) and Christopher Karloff (lead guitar). They were later joined by drummer Ian Matthews in 2004 and guitarist Jay Mehler replaced Karloff in 2006 as a live member. To date the band have released six studio albums: Kasabian (2004), Empire (2006), West Ryder Pauper Lunatic Asylum (2009), Velociraptor! (2011) 48:13 (2014) and For Crying Out Loud (2017).

The band have been nominated 39 times and have won 13 awards.

Brit Awards
The Brit Awards is an annual awards ceremony established in 1977. To date, Kasabian has received one award.

|-
|rowspan=3| 2005 ||rowspan=3| Kasabian || British Group || 
|-
| British Live Act || 
|-
| British Rock Act || 
|-
| 2006 || Kasabian || British Rock Act || 
|-
|rowspan=2| 2007 ||rowspan=2| Kasabian || British Group || 
|-
| British Live Act || 
|-
|rowspan=2| 2010 || Kasabian || British Group || 
|-
| West Ryder Pauper Lunatic Asylum || British Album of the Year || 
|-
| 2012 || Kasabian || British Group ||

MOJO Awards
The MOJO Awards are the UK's annual music awards run by music magazine, MOJO. To date, Kasabian has won one award.

|-
|rowspan=3| 2010 ||  West Ryder Pauper Lunatic Asylum || Best Album || 
|-
| "Fire" || Song of the Year || 
|-
| Kasabian || Best Live Act ||

Music Video Production Awards
The MVPA Awards are annually presented by a Los Angeles-based music trade organization to honor the year's best music videos.

|-
| 2007
| "Empire"
| Best Alternative Video 
|

Music Week Sync Awards
The Music Week Awards are UK's only music awards that recognise labels, publishing, live, retail, A&R, radio, marketing and PR, founded by the trade paper Music Week

|-
|2017
|"Comeback Kid"
| Video Game Soundtrack
|

NME Awards
The NME Awards is an annual music awards show founded by music magazine, NME. To date, Kasabian has won seven awards.

|-
| 2007 || Kasabian || Best Live Band || 
|-
|rowspan=4| 2010 ||rowspan=2| Kasabian || Best British Band || 
|-
| Best Live Band || 
|-
|rowspan=2| West Ryder Pauper Lunatic Asylum || Best Album || 
|-
| Best Album Artwork || 
|-
|rowspan=2| 2012 ||rowspan=2| Kasabian || Best British Band || 
|-
| Best Live Band || 
|- 
|rowspan=9| 2015 ||rowspan=4| Kasabian || Best British Band || 
|-
| Best Live Band ||
|-
| Best Fan Community || 
|-
| Best Quote || 
|-
| 48:13 || Best Album || 
|-
|rowspan=2| "Eez-eh" || Best Track || 
|-
| Dancefloor Filler || 
|-
| Kasabian: Summer Solstice || Best Music Film || 
|-
| Kasabian headline Glastonbury || Music Moment Of The Year ||

Q Awards
The Q Awards are the UK's annual music awards run by music magazine, Q. To date, Kasabian has won four awards.

|-
| 2004 || Kasabian || Best New Act || 
|-
| 2006 || "Empire" || Best Video || 
|-
| 2007 || Kasabian || Best Live Act || 
|-
|rowspan=3| 2009 || Kasabian || Best Live Act || 
|-
| "Fire" || Best Track || 
|-
| West Ryder Pauper Lunatic Asylum || Best Album || 
|-
|rowspan=2| 2010 ||rowspan=2| Kasabian || Best Act In The World Today || 
|-
| Best Live Act || 
|-
|rowspan=4| 2014 || "Eez-eh" || Best Track || 
|-
| 48:13 || Best Album || 
|-
|rowspan=2| Kasabian || Best Live Act || 
|-
| Best Act In The World Today || 
|-
| 2017
| "You're in Love with a Psycho"
| Best Track 
|

UK Music Video Awards
The UK Music Video Awards is an annual award ceremony founded in 2008 to recognise creativity, technical excellence and innovation in music videos and moving images for music. Kasabian has received one award from three nominations.

|-
| 2009
| Live T4 Special
| Best Live Music Coverage
| 
|-
| 2012
| Velociraptor
| Best Music AD
| 
|-
| 2017
| "Bless This Acid House"
| Best Rock/Indie Video - UK 
|

Žebřík Music Awards

!Ref.
|-
| 2011
| Velociraptor!
| Best International Album
| 
|

References

External links
 

Awards
Lists of awards received by British musician
Lists of awards received by musical group